The 1967–68 BBC2 Floodlit Trophy was the third occasion on which the BBC2 Floodlit Trophy competition had been held.

Castleford won the trophy by beating Leigh by the score of 8-5
The match was played at Headingley, Leeds, now in West Yorkshire. The attendance was 9,716 and receipts were £2,099
This was  the third of Castleford's three victories in successive seasons in the first three Floodlit competitions

Background 
This season the  original eight invitees plus the  three "newcomers" from  last season (Barrow, Rochdale Hornets and Salford) are joined by a further seven clubs.
These are Halifax, Huddersfield, Hull FC, Hull Kingston Rovers, Keighley, Wakefield Trinity and Wigan and bring the total of entrants up to eighteen.
This involved the  introduction of a preliminary knock-out round on a knock-out basis, to reduce the  numbers to sixteen, followed by a straightforward knock out competition.

Competition and results

Preliminary round  
Involved  2 matches and 4 clubs

Round 1 – first round 
Involved  8 matches and 16 clubs

Round 1 – replays 
Involved 2 matches and 4 clubs

Round 2 – quarter finals 
Involved 4 matches with 8 clubs

Round 2 – quarter finals – replays 
Involved 1 match and 2 clubs

Round 3 – semi-finals  
Involved 2 matches and 4 clubs

Final

Teams and scorers 

Scoring - Try = three (3) points - Goal = two (2) points - Drop goal = two (2) points

The road to success 
This tree excludes any preliminary round fixtures

Notes and comments 
1 * Hull F.C. join the competition and play first game in the competition
2 * Hull Kingston Rovers join the competition and play first game in the competition, and first at home in the competition
3 * Halifax join the competition and play first game in the competition, and first at home in the competition
4 * Huddersfield join the competition and play first game in the competition
5 * Wigan join the competition and play first game in the competition, and first at home in the competition
6 * Keighley join the competition and play first game in the competition
7 * Warrington, one of the  ten original competitors in 1965-66, win their first game in the  competition
8 * Wakefield Trinity join the competition and play first game in the competition, and first at home in the competition
9 * Leeds, one of the  ten original competitors in 1965-66, win their first game in the  competition
10 * Postponed due to fog
11 * match on TV
12 *  The  first of only two occasions on which the  BBC2 Floodlit Trophy was played on a neutral ground
13  * Headingley, Leeds, is the home ground of Leeds RLFC with a capacity of 21,000. The record attendance was  40,175 for a league match between Leeds and Bradford Northern on 21 May 1947.

General information for those unfamiliar 
The Rugby League BBC2 Floodlit Trophy was a knock-out competition sponsored by the BBC and between rugby league clubs, entrance to which was conditional upon the club having floodlights. Most matches were played on an evening, and those of which the second half was televised, were played on a Tuesday evening.
Despite the competition being named as 'Floodlit', many matches took place during the afternoons and not under floodlights, and several of the entrants, including  Barrow and Bramley did not have adequate lighting. And, when in 1973, due to the world oil crisis, the government restricted the use of floodlights in sport, all the matches, including the Trophy final, had to be played in the afternoon rather than at night.
The Rugby League season always (until the onset of "Summer Rugby" in 1996) ran from around August-time through to around May-time and this competition always took place early in the season, in the Autumn, with the final taking place in December (The only exception to this was when disruption of the fixture list was caused by inclement weather)

See also 
1967–68 Northern Rugby Football League season
1967 Lancashire Cup
1967 Yorkshire Cup
BBC2 Floodlit Trophy
Rugby league county cups

References

External links
Saints Heritage Society
1896–97 Northern Rugby Football Union season at wigan.rlfans.com
Hull&Proud Fixtures & Results 1896/1897
Widnes Vikings - One team, one passion Season In Review - 1896-97
The Northern Union at warringtonwolves.org
Huddersfield R L Heritage

BBC2 Floodlit Trophy
BBC2 Floodlit Trophy